The 1999–2000 Israel State Cup (Gvia HaMedina) was the 61st season of Israel's nationwide football cup competition and the 46th after the Israeli Declaration of Independence.

The competition was won by Hapoel Tel Aviv who had beaten Beitar Jerusalem 4–2 on penalties after 2–2 in the final.

As Hapoel Tel Aviv won the double, Beitar Jerusalem qualified to the 2000–01 UEFA Cup, entering in the qualifying round.

Results

Seventh Round

Byes: Hapoel Ironi Dimona, Hapoel Ironi Hod HaSharon, Hapoel Makr, Hapoel Nazareth Illit.

Intermediate Round

Eighth Round

Round of 16

Quarter-finals

Semi-finals

Final

References
100 Years of Football 1906–2006, Elisha Shohat (Israel), 2006, pp. 310–11
Israel Cups 1999/2000 RSSSF

Israel State Cup
State Cup
Israel State Cup seasons